Leslie Spotz is an American pianist. She is Professor of piano at Tarleton State University.

Biography

Spotz studied, as a full-scholarship recipient, at the Curtis Institute of Music with Mieczysław Horszowski, who was associated with Pablo Casals.

She completed her doctorate at Rutgers University in 2002.

She attended high school at the North Carolina School of the Arts in Winston-Salem, now known as the University of North Carolina School of the Arts, where, at age 15, as winner of the concerto competition she played Rachmaninoff's second piano concerto with Nicholas Harsanyi conducting.

Career

Spotz' international solo career has included performances in Moscow at the Tchaikovsky Hall of Moscow University, the South Bank Center of London, Kennedy Center in Washington, D.C., the Academy of Music in Philadelphia, tours of Germany, recitals in Italy for the Lorenzo de’Medici Institute and a performance at the inaugural opening of Philadelphia’s new performance venue, the Kimmel Center.  She heads the piano faculty at Tarleton State University in Stephenville, TX as a tenured associate professor.

Performances

Spotz has performed throughout the United States. Her appearances as a soloist include the Fort Worth Symphony Orchestra, Mozart Society of Philadelphia, South Jersey Symphony, Curtis Symphony, Kinhaven Symphony in Vermont, the Piedmont Chamber Orchestra in North Carolina, the Old York Road Symphony in Abington, PA, and the Clear Lake Symphony in Texas.  Concert highlights include performances of twenty Beethoven Sonatas at Rutgers University, the Beethoven Choral Fantasy Op. 80 with the Fort Worth Symphony Orchestra, and her recitals for the Bach Festival of Philadelphia.

Performances include: Kimmel Center, Philadelphia, Soviet Union - Moscow, Tchaikovsky Conservatory, London's South Bank Center, German tours, Kennedy Center, Washington, D.C., Academy of Music, Philadelphia, Philadelphia Art Alliance, Swarthmore College, University of Pennsylvania, Manhattan School of Music, American University, Franklin and Marshall College, WGMS-Radio, Washington, D.C., WHYY-Radio, Philadelphia, Pocono Music Festival, WFMT-FM Radio, Chicago, Rutgers University.  She has performed with cellist Kristin Isaacson in several recitals, including two performances in Texas in March 2011.

Honors

Spotz was finalist in the National Federation of Music Clubs Competition, and received special recognition in the performance of chamber music from Performers of Connecticut, Inc.

Spotz is an "internationally recognized pianist" by the International Piano Performance Examinations Committee (IPPEC) of Taiwan.

Recordings

An active proponent of music by women, her 1999 solo CD for Leonore Records features selections of music of women composers.  Her discography includes her performance on “Fantasias,” the  CD by flutist, Adeline Tomasone.

References

Curtis Institute of Music alumni
Living people
21st-century American women pianists
21st-century American pianists
Rutgers University alumni
Year of birth missing (living people)